During World War II, Operation Nelson was a planned Special Air Service operation scheduled for June, 1944 in the vicinity of the Orléans Gap. The operation was never executed when it was planned.

Conflicts in 1944
World War II British Commando raids
Special Air Service